Sugauli Paterwa  is a village development committee in Parsa District in the Narayani Zone of southern Nepal. At the time of the 2011 Nepal census it had a population of 5,765 people living in 1,046 individual households. There were 2,852 males and 2,913 females at the time of census.

References

Populated places in Parsa District